Bosch may refer to:

People
 Bosch (surname)
 Hieronymus Bosch (c. 1450 – 1516), painter
 Van den Bosch, a Dutch toponymic surname
 Carl Bosch, a German chemical engineer and nephew of Robert Bosch
 Robert Bosch, founder of Robert Bosch GmbH

Places
 Bosch (island), a former island in the Wadden Sea
 Bosch, Netherlands, a hamlet in North Brabant
 7414 Bosch, a main-belt asteroid named after Carl Bosch
 Bosch en Duin, Netherlands
 Den Bosch, colloquial name of 's-Hertogenbosch, Netherlands
 Villa Bosch, Argentina

Arts, entertainment, and media
 Harry Bosch, the nickname of Hieronymus Bosch, a fictional detective created by Michael Connelly
 Bosch (TV series), an American TV series based on Connelly's novels
 Huis Ten Bosch (theme park), Japan

Buildings
 Bosch Palace, the official residence of the U.S. Ambassador to Argentina
 Huis ten Bosch, an official palace of the Dutch Royal Family in The Hague, Netherlands
 Huis Ten Bosch Station, a train station for the theme park and train service of the same name in Japan
 Villa Bosch, a villa in Heidelberg and former residence of Carl Bosch, now the location of the Klaus Tschira Foundation

Companies and organisations
 Bosch Brewing Company, a small beer brewery founded by Joseph Bosch in Michigan, USA
 , a home appliance joint venture between Bosch and Siemens
 , a German engineering and technology company
 , a private charitable foundation and majority shareholder in

Science and technology
 Bosch reaction, a chemical reaction between carbon dioxide and hydrogen producing carbon, water and heat; named after Carl Bosch
 Bosch's Pitcher-Plant, named after Johannes van den Bosch

Other uses
 Huis Ten Bosch (train), a train service to a station and theme park of the same name
 Boche or Bosche, see a List of terms used for Germans, generally pejorative

See also
 Boch (disambiguation)
 Boche (disambiguation)
 Bochs, computer emulator
 Borsch (disambiguation)
 Bosc (disambiguation)
 Bosco (disambiguation)
 Bosh (disambiguation)
 Haber-Bosch, a process named after Fritz Haber and Carl Bosch
 Huis ten Bosch (disambiguation)